Du Sautoy is a surname. Notable people with the surname include:

Carmen du Sautoy (born 1950), British actress
Marcus du Sautoy (born 1965), British mathematician